Saarvindran a/l Devandran (born 4 October 1992 in Selangor) is a Malaysian footballer who plays for Penang in Malaysia Super League. He is known for his fast pace and long range shooting.

Saarvindran captained Harimau Muda B at the 2011 Malaysia Premier League.

On 16 November 2014, Saarvindran has confirmed that he will be joining Pahang for 2015 season. He has been granted permission to leave Harimau Muda A, the Malaysia U-23 national programme and further their careers in the domestic league.

After two years stint with Pahang, Saarvindran completed his transfer to Johor Darul Ta'zim II on 10 January 2017.

International goals

Under-23

See also
 Malaysia national football team

References

External links
 D. Saarvindran Profile at Goal.com

1992 births
Living people
Malaysian footballers
People from Selangor
Malaysian people of Tamil descent
Malaysian sportspeople of Indian descent
Sri Pahang FC players
Malaysia Super League players
Association football midfielders